Potentilla chamissonis, the  bluff cinquefoil, is distributed across Svalbard, northern Norway, Greenland and the eastern Arctic of Canada. It grows on ledges on steep slopes, and in crevices.

Description 
It is a loosely tufted plant growing from a stout stem base, reaching to 10–25 cm tall. The basal leaves are 3- (rarely 5-) foliate, hairy above, and densely tomentose beneath, the petioles and stems with long, straight hairs. The inflorescence is branched, bearing several fairly large flowers. The flowers have five petals, pale yellow, inversely heart-shaped, longer than sepals.

References

chamissonis
Flora of the Arctic
Flora of Greenland
Flora of Norway
Flora of Canada
Flora of Alaska
Flora without expected TNC conservation status